Vint is a Russian card game.

Vint may also refer to:

 Vint (given name), a masculine given name
 Vint (play), a 1985 short play
 Vint (surname), a surname